Darchal (also Romanized as Darchāl; also known as Balāl and Zā‘abā-ye Darchāl) is a village in Hoseynabad Rural District, in the Central District of Shush County, Khuzestan Province, Iran. At the 2006 census, its population was 627, in 86 families.

References 

Populated places in Shush County